was a Japanese explorer, cartographer, writer, painter, priest, and antiquarian. During the late Edo period and Bakumatsu he journeyed six times to Ezo, including to Sakhalin and the Kuriles. In the early Meiji period he was an official in the Hokkaidō Development Commission. Instrumental in the naming of the island and many of its places, he is sometimes referred to as the "godparent of Hokkaidō".

Name
Born at the Hour of the Tiger in the Year of the Tiger, the Take element of his name comes from the Japanese for bamboo, with which the tiger is closely associated. When he entered the Buddhist priesthood in Nagasaki at the age of twenty-one he assumed the Dharma name . He is also known to have used the art name  from 1859; this might be parsed as "man of Hokkaidō", "man well-versed in north sea ways", or "recluse of the northern seas".

Life
Matsuura Takeshirō was born  on the sixth day of the second month of Bunka 15 (1818) in the village of Sugawa, later , now Matsusaka, in what was then Ise Province, now Mie Prefecture. The samurai family is said to have had ancestral connections with the Matsuura clan of Hirado Domain in Hizen Province, northern Kyūshū. Takeshirō's father Tokiharu was a devotee of the tea ceremony and haikai and had studied under fellow Matsusaka scion Kokugaku scholar Motoori Norinaga. As his older brother was destined to take over as head of the family, Takeshirō knew from a young age he would have to venture forth in the world.

As a boy he showed signs of his later energy, playing on the temple roof, and enjoyed reading illustrated books of meisho or famous places. He also showed early literary promise himself, composing aged eleven a haiku on the subject of returning wild geese that met with the approbation of his father, and he began to manifest his later antiquarian leanings, copying pictures of temple bells from old books. Early in life he had ideas of becoming a Buddhist priest himself, but his parents discouraged the notion. Aged thirteen, he was sent to the school run by Confucian scholar , where he studied Chinese and had the opportunity to meet visiting scholars from all over the country, including ; he continued his studies there until he was sixteen.

In Tenpō 4 (1833) he abruptly set out from home, seemingly spurred on not only by wanderlust but also financial indiscretion, having been obliged secretly to sell some family heirlooms to settle debts run up buying books and antique curios. A letter written shortly after his departure notes his intentions to travel first to Edo, then Kyōto, before heading to Nagasaki, whence he would sail for Morokoshi, and perhaps even onwards to Tenjiku. The following year, yatate and notebooks to hand, he travelled from Kinki to Chūgoku and Shikoku and back; the next, through the Kinki, Hokuriku, Kōshin'etsu, Tōhoku (including Sendai and Matsushima), Kantō (where he served for a period at the mansion of Mizuno Tadakuni in Edo), Chūbu, and Kinki regions to Shikoku again; in 1836 he followed the Shikoku 88 temple pilgrimage route, then traversed the Kinki, San'in, and San'yō regions (including Tomonoura); the next year took him from San'yō around Kyūshū, due to travel restrictions entering Satsuma disguised as a Buddhist monk. In 1838, at the age of 21, he was taken seriously ill in Nagasaki during an epidemic. His father passed away that year, his sister and a brother having died several years previously. In 1842 he attempted to cross from Tsushima to Chōsen (Korea), but due to sakoku or the "closed country" policy, was unable to do so. His mother died at around this time. It was while in area of Nagasaki at the age of 26 that Matsuura heard from a village headman tales of Ezo and Karafuto, and also about the increasing Russian interest in the region and the approach of Russian ships. In 1844, for the first time in nine years, he returned home, paying his respects at the graves of his parents and visiting Ise Jingū, before setting out for the north.

Having reached as far as what is now Ajigasawa at the northern end of Honshū, he was unable to cross over to Ezo due to strict restrictions on travel imposed by the Matsumae Domain, turning back instead to Rikuzen Province. In 1845, at the age of 28, for the first time he crossed the Tsugaru Straits, to Esashi, which he left disguised as a merchant, travelling the length of the island for the next seventh months: he walked, with local Ainu as his guides, along the southern Pacific coast from Hakodate to the tip of the Shiretoko Peninsula, where he erected a marker inscribed , before making his way back again to Hakodate, and thence to Edo. Crossing back over the Sōya Strait, parting company, he walked the coast of the Sea of Okhotsk to the Shiretoko Peninsula before returning to Sōya by boat, then overland via Ishikari, Chitose, and Yūfutsu back to Esashi, and thence again to Honshū; while in Esashi he met Confucian scholar , the two competing each to compose a hundred poems and carve a hundred seals in one day. Three years later, in 1849, on his third Ezo expedition, he sailed from Hakodate to Kunashiri and Etorofu. He had now covered the whole of the north. In the words of Frederick Starr, "these journeys were epoch-making", with results of geographic, literary, and political significance. Again, "cartography for those regions practically dates from Matsuura". For this, equipped only with a pocket compass, he relied on his own pacing combined with observation from high points. At the same time, as well as active study of the Ainu language, he was becoming increasingly alive to the plight of the Ainu at the hands of unscrupulous traders and agents of the Matsumae Domain.

He did not return to Ezo until 1856, some seven years later. In the interim, he published multi-volume "diaries" of his first three visits, and interacted with many leading figures of this turbulent period. He was also in touch with Yoshida Shōin who, in an 1853 letter of introduction to an Ōsaka gunsmith, wrote critically of the Bakufu's response to Perry's arrival at Uraga and Putyatin's at Nagasaki, while recommending Matsuura Takeshirō as one who had left his mark all over the country, had intimate knowledge of Ezo, and had the question of coastal defence at his heart. In his autobiography, Matsuura Takeshirō writes of Yoshida Shōin's stay over the New Year of 1853/4, when they stayed up till dawn discussing this topic. After the 1854 Japan–US Treaty of Peace and Amity, 1855 brought the Treaty of Commerce and Navigation between Japan and Russia; exercised by the need for greater oversight and security on the northern borders, that year also the bakufu assume direct control of Ezo, excepting the immediate environs of Matsumae Castle.

Under the new shōgun Tokugawa Iesada, and with the situation in Ezo in light of Russian activity increasingly a priority, the significance of his endeavours began to receive recognition from the top: in 1855 he was given ten ryō of gold by the bakufu, with twice as much arriving in the next few days from Tokugawa Nariaki, daimyō of Mito Domain, and Date Yoshikuni, daimyō of Sendai Domain. He received instructions to travel to Ezo again, this time as an employee of the bakufu, for further work on its geography, to investigate its mountains and rivers, and the potential for new roads. Over the next three years, three visits would ensue—indeed, one theory sees those earlier not as private initiatives, but operations in the pay of the bakufu, connecting this to the obstacles placed in his way by the Matsumae Domain. Mukōyama died along the way, Matsuura himself so ill that he composed a death poem. The following year, abandoning plans for further investigation of Sakhalin, he followed the courses of the Ishikari and Teshio Rivers, from their mouths to their upstream regions. His final visit, in 1858, included investigation of the interior of the centre and the east of the island, around Akan. His surveys covered both physical and human geography, and suggestions for the development of the land and the advancement of its inhabitants. Records of these three years run to 117 volumes, while he also aimed at a wider audience through works such as Ezo Manga and a series of travelogues full of detail on the local mountains and rivers, flaura and fauna, and the customs, legends, and material culture of the Ainu he encountered along the way. Sympathetic to their plight, his 1858  (1860)
  (1861)
  (1862)
  (1863)
  (1863)
  (1863)
  (1865) (8 volumes)
  (1865) (6 volumes)

Hokkaidō Heritage
 
In 2018 a series of sixty-nine stelai inscribed with Matsuura Takeshirō's poems, markers denoting places he stayed, and other inscriptions and monuments in his honour was jointly designated Hokkaidō Heritage, an initiative aimed at valorization of the island's natural and cultural heritage, as Traces of Matsuura Takeshirō's Exploration of Ezo. These include:
 Atsuma: a stele in  erected in 1957 in relation to the hundredth anniversary of his two night stay in the vicinity in Ansei 5 (1858) (Municipal Tangible Cultural Property)
 Bifuka: the site where the name of the Teshio River (from the Ainu for a fishing weir) was recorded in Ansei 4 (1857) (Municipal Historic Site)
 Obira: a statue and inscribed poem in 
 Shari: an inscribed poem in Utoro
 Toyotomi: a marker where he stayed in Wakasanai, near the rest stop 

Gallery

See also
 Hokkaido Museum
 Adam Laxman
 Ten Foot Square Hut''

Notes

References

External links

 Biography on Matsusaka City website 

History of Hokkaido
People of Bakumatsu
People of Edo-period Japan
People of Meiji-period Japan
1818 births
1888 deaths
People from Matsusaka, Mie
Japanese cartographers
Japanese explorers
Japanese Buddhist clergy
Japanese painters